Potentilla thuringiaca is a species of flowering plant belonging to the family Rosaceae.

Its native range is Central and Eastern Europe to Siberia and Turkey, Sakhalin.

References

thuringiaca